Guangdong-Hong Kong Cup 2004–05 is the 27th staging of this two-leg competition between Hong Kong and Guangdong.

The first leg was played in Guangzhou while the second leg was played in Hong Kong.

Hong Kong captured champion by winning an aggregate 4–2 against Guangdong.

Squads

Hong Kong
Some of the players in the squad include:
  Cheung Sai Ho 蔣世豪
  Law Chun Bong 羅振邦
  Au Wai Lun 歐偉倫
  Xiao Guoji 蕭國基
  Chan Siu Ki 陳肇麒
  Lau Chi Keung 劉志强
  Fan Chun Yip 范俊業

Guangdong
Guangdong sent the football team which represented the province for 2005 National Games of China. The average age of the team was younger than 20 years old.
Some of the players in the squad include:
 Players of 20 years old or below:
  Huang Fengtao 黃鳳濤
  Lu Lin 盧琳
  Zhao Le 趙樂
 Players older than 20 years old:
  Yang Zhi 楊智 (Guangdong Kejian)
  Wu Weian 吳偉安
  Wu Pingfeng 吳坪楓
  Dai Xianrong 戴憲榮 (Guangzhou Sunray Cave)
 Coach:
  Chen Yuliang 陳玉良

Results
First Leg

Second Leg

Trivia
 After 2004 Indian Ocean earthquake, the HKFA announced that the second leg of this Guangdong-Hong Kong Cup would be for charity fund raising for the incident. All profits from the match went to the fund organized by AFC. More than 16,000 tickets were sold for the match and a fund of more than 2.8 million HK dollars was raised.
 Hong Kong lifted the trophy for the 10th time in history.

References

 HKFA website 省港盃回憶錄(十) (in chinese)
 HKFA website 近5屆省港盃回顧(三) (in chinese)

 

2005
2005 in Chinese football
2004–05 in Hong Kong football